Uncountry is the second solo studio album by Jason C. Miller. The album was released on October 10, 2011, by Count Mecha Music.

The title track was released as a single on September 2, 2011. The song "You Get What You Pay For" can be heard in Episode 7 of the third season of HBO's True Blood.

Track listing

Credits and Personnel 
 Jason Charles Miller – Vocals, Acoustic guitar, Electric Guitar, producer, Writing
 Russell Ali – Guitar
 David D. Diaz – Drums
 Paul Cartwright – Fiddle
 Ben Peeler – Lap Steel, Dobro
 Jonah Mclean – Keyboard
 Adam Hall – Banjo
 Dave Mattera – Bass Guitar
 Brett Boyett – Slide guitar
 Jon Walls – Drums, Mixing, Engineering
 James Mitchell – Electric Guitar
 Steve Hinson – Pedal Steel
 Mike Wolofsky – Bass Guitar
 Dennis Wage – Keyboard
 Wayne Killius – Drums
 Pat McGrath – Acoustic guitar
 Biff Watson – Acoustic guitar
 Adam Shoenfeld – Electric Guitar
 Nick Buda – Drums
 Aubrey Richmond – Fiddle
 Mike Brignardello – Bass Guitar
 "Cowboy" Eddie Long – Pedal Steel
 Jim "Moose" Brown – Keyboard
 Michael "Fish" Herring – Electric Guitar Solo
 Jamison "Metal" Boaz – Acoustic guitar Solo, Backing Vocals
 Caroline Clark – Backing Vocals
 Tina Guo – Cello
 Eric Berdon – Acoustic guitar
 Ben Carey – Electric Guitar
 Jeff Friedel – Drums
 Marty O’Brien – Bass Guitar
 George Balulis – Electric Guitar
 Ted Russell Kamp – Slide guitar
 Jay Ruston – Mixing, Engineering, producer
 Stewart Cararas – Mastering
 Darren Leader – Producer
 Phil Barton – Writing
 Kris Bergsnes – Writing
 Geoff Bisente – Mixing, Engineering, Gang Vocals
 Dan Hodges – Producer
 Dan Certa – Mixing, Engineering
 Derek Jones – Mixing, Engineering
 Jordan Greene – Engineering
 Jon Nite – Writing
 David Rivers – Writing
 Chuck Goff – Writing
 Bart Allmand – Writing

References 

2011 albums
Jason C. Miller albums